Sa’ban is one of the remoter languages of Borneo, on the Sarawak–Kalimantan border.

Classification 
Sa'ban is a member of the Apo Duat subgroup of languages, which also includes Kelabit, Lun Bawang/Lundayeh and Tring. Collectively, they belong to the North Sarawak subgroup of the Austronesian family. Today, the Sa'ban people live in Long Peluan, Long Banga' and Long Balong in Sarawak, Malaysia. There are also Sa'ban groups in Kalimantan, Indonesia.

Phonology 
The Sa'ban language has several sounds that are rare among the world's languages. These include voiceless nasal and liquid consonants and a distinction between long and short vowels as well as long and short consonants. Some examples of words with voiceless nasals and liquids are given in the table below. They have a stative reading in contrast to long consonants:

Bibliography 
 
 Blust, Robert (2001). ‘Language, Dialect and Riotous Sound Change: The case of Sa’ban’. In Graham W. Thurgood (ed.) Papers from the Ninth Annual Meeting of the Southeast Asian Linguistics Society, 249–359. Tempe: Arizona State University.
 Clayre, Beatrice (1972). "A preliminary comparative study of the Lun Bawang (Murut) and Sa’ban languages of Sarawak". Sarawak Museum Journal 20: 40-41, 45-47.
 Clayre, Beatrice (1994). ‘Sa’ban: a case of language change’. In Peter W. Martin (ed) Shifting Patterns of Language Use in Borneo, 209-226. Williamsburg VA: Borneo Research Council.
 Clayre, Beatrice (2005). "Kelabitic languages and the fate of ‘focus’: evidence from the Kerayan". In I Wayan Arka & Malcolm Ross (eds.) The many faces of Austronesian voice systems: some new empirical studies, 17-57. Canberra: Pacific Linguistics.
 Clayre, Beatrice (2014). ‘A preliminary typology of the languages of Middle Borneo’. In Peter Sercombe, Michael Boutin & Adrian Clynes (eds.) Advances in research on cultural and linguistic practices in Borneo, 123-151. Phillips, Maine USA: Borneo Research Council.
 
 Omar, Asmah Haji (1983). The Malay Peoples of Malaysia and Their Languages. Kuala Lumpur: Art Printing Works.

References

External links 
Kaipuleohone has archived written materials as well as audio recordings (RB1-001, RB1-003-A)

PHOIBLE Online phonemic inventories for Sa'ban

Apo Duat languages
Languages of Indonesia
Languages of Malaysia
Endangered Austronesian languages